Ahrenviöl (North Frisian: Årnfjål) is a municipality in Nordfriesland district, in northern Germany. It is part of the Amt Viöl.

References

Nordfriesland